Edward Boulter (23 March 1886 – 10 June 1968) was an Australian cricketer. He played one first-class cricket match for Victoria in 1912.

See also
 List of Victoria first-class cricketers

References

External links
 

1886 births
1968 deaths
Australian cricketers
Victoria cricketers
Cricketers from Melbourne